The Cerghid is a left tributary of the river Niraj in Transylvania, Romania. It joins the Niraj near Ungheni.

References

Rivers of Romania
Rivers of Mureș County